The Demopolis Chalk is a geological formation in North America, within the U.S. states of Alabama, Mississippi, and Tennessee. The chalk was formed by pelagic sediments deposited along the eastern edge of the Mississippi embayment during the middle Campanian stage of the Late Cretaceous.  It is a unit of the Selma Group and consists of the upper Bluffport Marl Member and a lower unnamed member.  Dinosaur and mosasaur remains are among the fossils that have been recovered from the Demopolis Chalk.

Vertebrate paleofauna

Fish

Cartilaginous fish

Bony fish

Reptiles

Dinosaurs
Indeterminate hadrosaurid remains have been found in Tennessee. Possible indeterminate tyrannosaurid remains have been found in Alabama.

Mosasaurs

Plesiosaurs

See also

List of dinosaur-bearing rock formations
List of fossil sites

References

 
Geologic formations of Mississippi
Upper Cretaceous Series of North America
Cretaceous Alabama
Cretaceous geology of Tennessee
Chalk